Schenectady station is an Amtrak intercity train station in Schenectady, New York. The station, constructed in 2018 is owned by the Capital District Transportation Authority which also owns Albany–Rensselaer station and Saratoga Springs station. 

Schenectady is served by five Amtrak routes. The Lake Shore Limited operates one train in each direction daily between Chicago and Boston/New York City (via two sections east of Albany), while the Empire Service operates two trains in each direction between Niagara Falls and New York City, the Maple Leaf serves the station with one train in each direction between Toronto and New York City as does the Ethan Allen Express between New York City and Rutland, Vermont and the Adirondack between New York City and Montreal.

History

Original station

The current station is the third to be built on the site. The original Schenectady Union Station was constructed in 1908 by the New York Central Railroad and the Hudson River Railroad after the railroad grade was raised throughout the city and was in service until it was closed in 1969 by Penn Central due to low ridership and the cost of heating and maintaining the large station. It was replaced with Colonie-Schenectady near NY-155 several miles to the east in Colonie. The Colonie-Schenectady station was a small building with a parking lot. Penn Central then sold the union station building to the city in December 1970 for $20,000. For a brief time there was talk of the station being renovated into an opera house for the Schenectady Light Opera Company but nothing came of the proposal. After its closure, the Union Station was sold by Penn Central to the city of Schenectady in 1970 for $20,000. The Union Station was demolished by the city in 1971 to make way for a parking lot.

First Amtrak station

After the takeover of passenger trains by Amtrak, talks began about moving the Schenectady stop from Colonie back to its original location.

In 1978, train service returned to Schenectady and work began on a new station. In 1979, the new Schenectady station was completed on the site of the former Union Station. It was of a standard design. It was built under the railroad tracks with an elevator and staircase leading to a railway platform between the two tracks and was made possible through a partnership among Amtrak, the State of New York and the City of Schenectady. The state funded the rehabilitation of the tracks at $3.9 million, while Amtrak paid two-thirds of the $881,000 cost of the depot with the state covering the rest. The city donated the land. Passengers were able to board at the new station beginning in October 1978, though no customer service agents were present until July 29, 1979, and the station did not fully open until August 8. The new station decimated ridership at Colonie-Schenectady, which was closed on September 9, 1979 to allow trains to operate at full speed between Albany and Schenectady. By the early 2000s the station was showing its age and plans were made to demolish it and replace it with a new station. The 1979 station was closed and demolished in 2017 in preparation for construction of the current station.

Current station

The replacement structure is known as the Schenectady Intermodal Station was constructed on the site of the former station. It serves both Amtrak and local transit service. The Capital District Transportation Authority (CDTA) received a US $4.2 million grant for the construction of the planned structure in October 2010.

By 2014, funding from federal and state sources for the new station had reached $15 million and the CDTA had largely completed design work for a four-story station building, though by 2015 it had been scaled down to two stories. Track construction was planned to begin in the spring of 2014, but was delayed until fall, with station construction to go out to bid in 2014 for completion in 2017. In August 2015, the Metroplex Development Authority sold Amtrak  of parking lot that was intended to allow for construction of a temporary station to begin immediately, followed by the demolition of the 1979 building and construction of the replacement station.

In late March 2016, NYSDOT announced it would seek a second round of bids for building the new station, after the only bid from the first round was $24.9 million, far more than the budgeted $14.6 million.  The decision delayed the estimated opening of the new facility to 2018. NYSDOT then paid a contractor $900,000 to redesign the station to reduce costs. In July 2016, NYSDOT announced that it would divide the project into two contracts for rebidding. Demolition of the existing station, along with repairs to the viaduct, was bid in February 2017. Three bids were received, with the low bid within budget at $5.4 million.

The 1979 station was closed and demolished in July 2017. In the interim, a temporary stairwell and platform with a shelter were erected at a parking lot north of the station site to serve as a temporary station. Construction of the replacement station had been bid in Fall 2017 for completion at the end of 2018. The station has two floors with a golden dome topped with a weather vane shaped like New York state and large arched windows and expanded seating. The inside features images of the Erie Canal and the former American Locomotive Company train yard and include other memorabilia to illustrate the city's history. The facility also includes retail space, charging stations and digital display boards to provide information. It is ADA compliant. The station was expected to open in November 2018 but opened two weeks ahead of schedule on October 17, 2018. 

The construction of the new Schenectady station was part of upgrades being made to the Empire Corridor and was built shortly after new stations were completed in Niagara Falls and Rochester.

In March 2020, Adirondack and Ethan Allen Express service at the station was suspended indefinitely, with trains being truncated to Albany–Rensselaer station as part of a round of service reductions in response to the ongoing coronavirus pandemic. Ethan Allen service resumed on July 19, 2021, and Adirondack service resumed on December 5, 2022.

Station layout

The station has one low-level island platform. An additional track exists east of Track 2, which does not serve the station nor carry revenue passenger service.

References

External links 

Amtrak stations in New York (state)
Former New York Central Railroad stations
Buildings and structures in Schenectady, New York
Transportation in Schenectady County, New York
Railway stations in the United States opened in 1909
Railway stations in the United States opened in 1979
Railway stations in the United States opened in 2018